Statistics of Dhivehi League in the 2010 season.

Clubs
All Youth Linkage FC
Club Valencia
Maaziya SRC
New Radiant SC 
Thoddoo FC (name changed from Kalhaidhoo ZJ)
VB Sports
Victory Sports Club
Vyansa

League table
<onlyinclude>

2011 Dhivehi League promotion/relegation play-off

External links
Maldives 2010, RSSSF.com

Dhivehi League seasons
Maldives
Maldives
1